Armstrong may refer to:

Places 
 Armstrong Creek (disambiguation), various places

Antarctica
 Armstrong Reef, Biscoe Islands

Argentina
 Armstrong, Santa Fe

Australia
 Armstrong, Victoria

Canada
 Armstrong, British Columbia
 Armstrong, Ontario
 Armstrong, Thunder Bay District, Ontario
 Armstrong, Ontario (Indian settlement)

United States
 Armstrong, California
 Armstrong, Delaware
 Armstrong, Florida
 Armstrong, Georgia
 Armstrong, Illinois
 Armstrong, Indiana
 Armstrong, Iowa
 Armstrong, Minnesota
 Armstrong, Missouri
 Armstrong, Oklahoma
 Armstrong, Texas
 Armstrong, Wisconsin
 Armstrong County, Pennsylvania
 Armstrong County, Texas
 Armstrong Lake (Blue Earth County, Minnesota), a lake in Minnesota
 Armstrong Township, Vanderburgh County, Indiana
 Armstrong Township, Pennsylvania (disambiguation), more than one, including
 Armstrong Township, Indiana County, Pennsylvania
 Armstrong Township, Lycoming County, Pennsylvania
 Louis Armstrong New Orleans International Airport
 Armstrong Tunnel, in Pittsburgh, Pennsylvania

People 

 Armstrong (surname), including a list of people with the surname
 Neil Armstrong, first person to walk on the moon
George Armstrong (footballer), An Arsenal English Footballer
 Lance Edward Armstrong, an American former professional road racing cyclist
 Louis Armstrong, an American trumpeter who was one of the most influential figures in jazz
 Clan Armstrong, a Scottish clan from the border area between England and Scotland
 Armstrong Williams, American political commentator
 Armstrong, a character in the Valiant Comics comic book Archer & Armstrong
Billie Joe Armstrong, lead singer of Green Day
Edwin Howard Armstrong, electronic engineer
Joe Armstrong (programmer), computer scientist and co-designer of the Erlang (programming language)
Herbert Rowse Armstrong, British solicitor convicted and executed for murder

Companies 
 Armstrong-CCM Motorcycles, British motorcycling company
 Armstrong Audio, a British audio/hi-fi manufacturer
 Armstrong Group of Companies, a conglomerate begun in Armstrong County, Pennsylvania
 Armstrong Telephone Company, a telecommunications provider serving as a local exchange carrier in rural market
 Armstrong Tools, an industrial hand tool manufacturer
 Armstrong Whitworth, the British engineering conglomerate which became Vickers-Armstrong
 Armstrong Whitworth Aircraft, a separate entity
 Armstrong World Industries, a manufacturer of ceilings and walls.
 Armstrong Flooring, a manufacturer of flooring
 Armstrong investment managers

Government facility 
 NASA Neil A. Armstrong Flight Research Center, A NASA research center

Other possible meanings 
 6469 Armstrong, minor planet
 Armstrong (automobile), an early English car
 Armstrong Atlantic State University, a public university in Savannah, Georgia
 Armstrong (content management system), an open source news publishing platform
 Armstrong (crater), a lunar crater
 Armstrong Gun, a rifled breech-loading artillery piece
 Armstrong Whitworth Whitley, World War II bomber
 Armstrong (DuckTales episode), an episode of DuckTales
 Armstrong's axioms, a set of axioms used to infer all the functional dependencies on a relational database
 Armstrongs, a band including Billie Joe Armstrong and Tim Armstrong
 The Armstrongs, a British television series

See also
 Ångström (disambiguation)
 George Armstrong Custer